Grey v Hastings (1410) was a heraldic law of arms case brought in England. The case resulted from two different families found using the same undifferenced coat of arms.

Edward Hastings of Elsing and Reginald Grey of Ruthin disputed each other's right to bear the undifferenced arms. The right to the arms was granted to Lord Grey, however, rather than being able to bear the undifferenced arms of Hastings of Sutton, he won the right to the higher status quartered arms born by his deceased cousin the Earl of Pembroke: Quarterly, 1st and 4th: Or, a maunch gules (Hastings); 2nd and 3rd: Barry of argent and azure, an orle of martlets gules (Pembroke) (shown below).
.
Lord Hastings appealed the case, however, refused to pay court costs, to not create a presumption of acquiescence based on the contemporary rules of evidence, and was imprisoned.

See also
Court of Chivalry
College of Arms
Scrope v Grosvenor
Warbelton v Gorges

References

English heraldry
1410s in law
1410s in England
English case law
Heraldry and law
United Kingdom intellectual property case law
1410 in Europe